W le donne (i.e. "Hurrah for the women") is a 1970 Italian "musicarello" film directed by Aldo Grimaldi and starring Little Tony.

Plot

Cast 

 Little Tony as  Tony Marconi	
 Stefania Doria as Simonetta La Rosa
Franco Franchi as  Franco Samperi
Ciccio Ingrassia as  Ciccio La Rosa
Pippo Franco as  Victor Santaniello
Gino Bramieri as  Don Nicola
 Luciano Fineschi as  Captain Luciani	
 Anna Zinnemann  as  Donna Lulù
Nino Terzo as The Sergeant 
Carlo Sposito as  Galluppi	
Ignazio Balsamo as  Maresciallo Palombi	
Paola Tedesco as  Nenè
Pippo Baudo as  Colonel Bertoluzzi	
Anna Maestri as  Don Nicola's Wife
 Mirella Pamphili as  Mimì
 Valeria Sabel as  Simonetta's Mother
Mario Del Vago as Japan Maritime Self-Defense Force officer

See also    
 List of Italian films of 1970

References

External links

1970 films
Musicarelli
1970s musical comedy films
Films directed by Aldo Grimaldi
Military humor in film
1970 comedy films
1970s Italian films